Rompiendo Fuente (English: Water Break)  is the sixth single of Juan Luis Guerra sixth studio album Areito, released in 1993 by Karem Records. The song was written and produced by Juan Luis Guerra and his band 4:40. The tracks is a merengue with some elements of Afropop inspired Taino Indigenous. The song is a metaphor lamenting precarious situation of a woman working on a factory that is giving a birth to a girl. The track receive favorable reviews by the critics. Howell Llewelyn from Billboard on an article wrote about the song "the most touching song ever written by a man on the subject of giving birth".

Tracklist 

 Spain CD-Single (1993)
 Rompiendo Fuerte - 4:26
 Guavaberry - 4:19

Charts

References 

1993 singles
1993 songs
Juan Luis Guerra songs
Songs written by Juan Luis Guerra